Independence generally refers to the self-government of a nation, country, or state by its residents and population.

Independence may also refer to:

Mathematics
Algebraic independence
Independence (graph theory), edge-wise non-connectedness
Independence (mathematical logic), logical independence
Independence (probability theory), statistical independence
Linear independence

Films
Independence (1976 film), a docudrama directed by John Huston
Independence (1999 film), a 1999 Indian film in Malayalam

Music
Independence (Lulu album), 1993
Independence (Kosheen album), 2012

Naval ships
Independence class (disambiguation), several classes of ships
USS Independence, any of seven US Navy ships
Texan schooner Independence, an 1832 ship in the Texas Navy during the Texas Revolution

Transportation
SS Independence, an American passenger ship (built 1951)
Independence (cruise ship), a small cruise ship (built 2010)
FSRU Independence, a 2014 floating LNG storage and regasification unit
Independence (schooner), a 35-ton schooner
Independence Air, an American low-cost airline
Independence Airport (disambiguation)
Independence (Amtrak station), in Independence, Missouri, United States
Chevrolet Series AE Independence, an American automobile introduced in 1931
Independence Avenue (disambiguation), in various countries
Independence Paragliding, a German paraglider manufacturer
Independence 20, an American sailboat design for disabled sailors
Independence (fireboat), a fireboat operated in Philadelphia, since 2007
Independence (aircraft), US presidential transport in the 1940s and 1950s

Schools
Independence Community College, in Independence, Kansas, United States
Independence High School (disambiguation)
Baltimore Independence School, a public charter high school in Baltimore, Maryland, United States
Independence Middle School (Jupiter, Florida), United States
Independence Middle School (Independence, Ohio), United States

Sports teams
Charlotte Independence, an American soccer team based in Charlotte, North Carolina
Philadelphia Independence, a former American soccer team based in Chester, Pennsylvania

Places

United States 
Independence County, Arkansas
Independence, California, a census-designated place in Inyo County
Independence, Calaveras County, California, an unincorporated community
Independence, Pitkin County, Colorado, a ghost town
Independence, Indiana, an unincorporated community
Independence, Iowa, a city
Independence, Kansas, a city
Independence, Kentucky, a home rule-class city
Independence, Louisiana, a town
Independence, Minnesota, a city in Hennepin County
Independence, St. Louis County, Minnesota, an unincorporated community
Independence, Mississippi, an unincorporated community
Independence, Missouri, a city
Independence, New York, a town
Independence, Ohio, a city in Cuyahoga County
Independence, Defiance County, Ohio, an unincorporated community in Defiance County, Ohio
Independence, Oklahoma, a ghost town
Independence, Oregon, a city
Independence, Tennessee, an unincorporated community
Independence, Texas, an unincorporated community
Independence, Utah, a town
Independence, Virginia, a town
Independence, Barbour County, West Virginia, an unincorporated community
Independence, Clay County, West Virginia, an unincorporated community
Independence, Jackson County, West Virginia, an unincorporated community
Independence, Preston County, West Virginia, an unincorporated community
Independence, Washington, an unincorporated community
Independence, Wisconsin, a city
Independence County, Washington, a proposed county
Independence Township (disambiguation)
Lake Independence (disambiguation), various American lakes (and one constituency in Belize)
Independence River, a tributary of the Black River in New York
Independence Lake (Colorado)
Independence Lakes, a number of lakes in Idaho
Lake Independence (Michigan)
Lake Independence (Jackson County, Minnesota)
Independence National Historical Park, in Philadelphia, Pennsylvania
Independence Rock (Wyoming)
Fort Independence (disambiguation)
Mount Independence (disambiguation)

Elsewhere 
Independence and Mango Creek, adjacent villages (considered as one community) in Belize
Independence, a former name of Niulakita, Tuvalu
Independence Fjord, Greenland

Other uses
Financial independence
Independence Blue Cross, an American health insurer
Independence Power Plant, near Newark, Arkansas
Ulmus americana 'Independence', an American Elm cultivar
Independence (Israeli political party), a political party in Israel
Space Shuttle Independence, full-scale, high-fidelity replica of the Space Shuttle

See also
 
 
Independence Party (disambiguation)
Independence Bowl, an annual American college football game
Independence College (disambiguation)
Independence Stadium (disambiguation)
Independence Square (disambiguation)
Independence Plaza (disambiguation)
Independence Hall (disambiguation)
Independence Mall (disambiguation)
Independence Centre (disambiguation)
Palace of Independence (disambiguation)
Independencia (disambiguation)
Independência (disambiguation)